Bapa may refer to:

 Jalaram Bapa (1799–1937), Hindu saint from Gujarat, India
 Thakkar Bapa (1869–1951), Indian social worker in Gujarat, India
 Chhagan Bapa (1894–1968), Indian social worker in Gujarat, India
 , a village

See also 
 BAPA (disambiguation)